If You're Gone may refer to:

 "If You're Gone" (Matchbox Twenty song), 2000
 "If You're Gone" (The Byrds song), 1965

See also
 You're Gone (disambiguation)